Alfred Louis Smith and Arthur Ebden Johnson were architects who designed many public buildings of Melbourne in the classical style.

Both architects emigrated to Melbourne from London where they had been trained by leading British architects and designers in the execution of the classical style. After meeting each other in the Colonial Architect's Department they opened a private practice connected with the Public Works Department (PWD). Despite the popularity of other architectural styles of the time such as Gothic, Smith and Johnson practiced in a time when the dignity of classical architecture was still considered the right and proper style for town halls, museums, art galleries and post offices. This perception of public buildings coupled with Smith and Johnson's background gave them great opportunities to execute instrumental buildings in a burgeoning new city flooded with the prosperity of the 1851 Victorian Gold Rush.

Works completed by Smith and Johnson included the Bank of Victoria, Imperial Insurance office, and Baring Chambers in Market Street, the Athenaeum, Union Bank and Ebden's house in Collins Street, the Fire Brigade Station in Eastern Hill, Esplanade Hotel in St. Kilda and adjoining residence, the old Fish Market, Presbyterian Church in William Street, numerous banks and large residences, the Melbourne Law Courts, and the Colonial Bank.

Their commitment to architecture in Victoria was further exemplified when, in 1856, with T.J. Crouch they were founders of the Royal Victorian Institute of Architects (RVIA), and became members of the Philosophical Institute of Victoria (Royal Society of Victoria) in 1858/59.

Arthur Ebden Johnson, 1821–1895

Born in the south of England, Johnson studied at the Royal Academy and Royal Institute of British Architects, and was a pupil of Philip Hardwick in London. At the age of 17 Johnson committed to a 5-year apprenticeship with the firm of Wigg & Pownall in London. In 1840-1 he was awarded a prize from the Architectural Association for the greatest number of approved sketches.  In 1843 Johnson was awarded the Soane medal for his entry in response to the Royal Institute of British Architects brief for the design of a 'Princely Palace'.  Johnson's design was entitled 'A Princelie Palace in the Elizabethan Style' (the drawings are held by the RIBA).

In 1846 at the age of 25 Johnson became partner of later Sir Horace Jones, city Architect of London; who in conjunction with Mr. Pearson erected Weighbridge Church in Surrey. Jones is best known for his later work in the design of Tower Bridge, London.

In 1845 Johnson received the Gold Medal from the Royal Academy for a design for a National Record Office. He left the U.K. and emigrated to Melbourne in 1851.  In 1858 Johnson entered a competition for the design of the new General Post Office in Melbourne, and despite receiving the second prize, his design was ultimately selected for construction.  He was then appointed in 1859 as an architect at the Public Works Department under the leadership of the newly appointed chief architect William Wardell, initially to implement the GPO project.  Johnson was one of the leading architects in the PWD, together with contemporaries such as J.J. Clark. It was during this period that he met Alfred Smith, and it appears they may have cooperated even during the time of Johnson's employment at the PWD.

In 1873, and with Johnson still in the employ of the PWD, Johnson and Smith prepared a joint competition entry for the new Supreme Court of Victoria.  The technical planning of this project was heavily influenced in the London Law Courts competition of 1868 (as were the other entries) and the submission was successful, creating serious embarrassment for Wardell.  The issue was documented in evidence to the 1873 Royal Commission into the PWD. Later in 1873 Johnson resigned from the PWD and began the private practice "Smith & Johnson". The first project of the partnership was the Supreme Court design.  Its implementation was delayed when the Chief Justice, Sir William Stawell, suggested that Smith & Johnson should abandon their submitted design and follow the plan of the Four Courts in Dublin. This scheme was adopted and the courts opened in February 1884. This led to a wide range of private sector commissions, in particular numerous bank buildings for the Bank of Victoria, headquarters for the Union Bank (1878) and a number of large houses in Toorak. The bank work was largely a continuation of commercial relationships established by Alfred Smith prior to 1873.

In 1889 Johnson was awarded the silver medal for Architectural Designs and Drawings in connection with the Melbourne Centennial Exhibition. Johnson became the Australian Institute of Architects's Victoria President from 1893 to 1895. Johnson died on 29 May 1895, aged 74.

Alfred Louis Smith, 1830–1907

Born in London, Smith trained under the Master Builder Thomas Cubitt, who was from a family of well-respected architects working in the classical style.  This experience exposed Smith to an architectural practice involved in building major landmark structures in London. These included the enlargement of Buckingham Palace and the relocation of Marble Arch.

After emigrating to Melbourne in 1851 (a partial diary of his trip is held by the Brighton Historical Society), Smith was briefly employed by the Colonial Architects office.  It was here that he may have met Arthur Johnson.  In April 1852 Smith resigned from this position to establish a private practice. He was in partnership, from 1864 to 1870, with architect and surveyor Thomas Watts (c1826-1915), operating from Smith’s office in Bank Place. The two worked together on the designs of a number of large rural homesteads, such as that at Golf Hill Station. Among Smith & Watt’s major projects in the city in the mid 1860s were the designs for the Melbourne Sailors’ Home in Spencer St, the fish market in Flinders Street and the Baptist Church in Albert St, East Melbourne.

Smith may have collaborated with Johnson during the period 1852 to 1873, though during this period Johnson was employed by the Public Works Department.  It was not until 1873 with success in the Supreme Court competition, that Johnson resigned from the PWD and the practice of Smith and Johnson was formed, with the prime initial commission of the Courts complex.

In 1892 Smith was Elected Fellow at the RVIA. He died at Bedford Lodge, St.Kilda, on 18 October 1907, aged 76.

Completed works

References

External links
 
 
 
 Google map of buildings by Smith and Johnson

Architecture firms based in Victoria (Australia)
Design companies established in 1852
Australian companies established in 1852